All figures are rounded to three significant.

Notes

See also 
List of companies and cities in Africa that manufacture cement

References

External links
 Complete list
 IBEF – India Brand Equity Foundation
 Association of the Cement Industries Employers (Iran)

Cement
Cement industry